Óscar Miguel Sevilla Rivera (born 29 September 1976), nicknamed El Niño, is a Spanish-Colombian professional road bicycle racer, who currently rides for UCI Continental team . He is a climber with a pedigree in stage races, having finished in the top ten of the Tour de France and Vuelta a España several times.

Biography

Kelme–Costa Blanca (1998–2003)
Born in Ossa de Montiel, Albacete Province, Sevilla turned professional in 1998 for Spanish team , and his big breakthrough came in the 2001 Tour de France. Here, he showed himself as a great climber, ranking 7th in the overall General classification, and winning the young rider classification as the rider of 25 years of age or younger with the highest position in the general classification. After the Tour de France, he continued his great form in the 2001 Vuelta a España. He wore the leader's jersey until the final uphill time trial stage in Madrid, which he lost to winner Ángel Casero.

In the 2002 Vuelta a España, intra-team rivalry with Aitor González saw him finish fourth in the General classification, despite the team's initial assurances that he would be the only leader. González's racing in the very difficult Angliru mountain stage saw Sevilla lose valuable time that he was not able to recover in the later stages of the race, and Gonzalez took over the lead on the final stage, overtaking previous leader Roberto Heras. After a lacklustre 2003 season, Sevilla was injured in the 2003 UCI Road World Championships in a crash, resulting in a serious back injury.

Phonak (2004)
The 2004 season saw Sevilla start with the Swiss team  in support of Tyler Hamilton's bid for the 2004 Tour de France. As Hamilton sustained an injury, Sevilla assumed the leader's mantle, although without good results.

T-Mobile (2005–06)
Here, he helped Ullrich finish 3rd overall, and Sevilla's climbing improved, as well as his morale. He rode the 2005 Vuelta a España as team captain and ranked 7th overall.

He was linked to Operación Puerto doping case. After he was initially named in the investigation, Sevilla was still able to ride and won the Vuelta a Asturias. On the day before the 2006 Tour de France, Ullrich and Sevilla were explicitly linked to the investigation and not allowed to start the race. On 20 July 2006, Sevilla was fired from T-Mobile in relation to the aforementioned accusations.

Relax–GAM and Rock Racing (2007–10)

Colombian teams (2011–present)
He rode for Gobernación de Antioquía in the 2011 Tour of Utah. Sevilla renewed his contract with the Colombian  team, with whom he had been racing since 2017, for another season in November 2019.

Personal life
He currently lives in Colombia, having married a Colombian woman with whom he has two daughters, and became a Colombian citizen in 2012.

Major results

1999
 6th Overall Tour du Limousin
 7th Overall Tour de Romandie
1st Stage 4
2000
 1st Trofeo Luis Ocaña
 1st Memorial Manuel Galera
 2nd Overall Volta a Catalunya
 2nd Overall Vuelta a Burgos
 6th Circuito de Getxo
 6th Subida a Urkiola
2001
 2nd Overall Vuelta a España
 2nd Subida al Naranco
 3rd Overall Escalada a Montjuïc
1st Stage 1b (ITT)
 3rd Clásica a los Puertos de Guadarrama
 4th Overall Tour de Romandie
 4th Overall Vuelta a Burgos
 5th Overall Volta a Catalunya
 7th Overall Tour de France
1st  Young rider classification
2002
 1st Stage 1b Escalada a Montjuïc
 2nd Classique des Alpes
 3rd Subida al Naranco
 3rd Clásica a los Puertos de Guadarrama
 4th Overall Vuelta a España
 4th Coppa Ugo Agostoni
 6th Overall Vuelta a Castilla y León
2004
 3rd Overall Critérium du Dauphiné Libéré
 6th Classique des Alpes
 9th Overall Escalada a Montjuïc
2005
 6th Overall Escalada a Montjuïc
 7th Overall Vuelta a España
2006
 1st  Overall Vuelta a Asturias
1st  Points classification
1st Stage 2
2007
 1st  Overall Route du Sud
1st Stage 2
 5th Overall Volta a Catalunya
1st Stage 4
 5th Overall Vuelta a Castilla y León
 5th Overall Escalada a Montjuïc
 6th Overall Tour of Austria
 7th Overall Vuelta a Asturias
 8th Overall Euskal Bizikleta
 9th Overall Volta a Portugal
2008
 1st  Overall Clásico RCN
 1st Reading Classic
 2nd Road race, Spanish National Road Championships
 5th Overall Tour of Qinghai Lake
 6th Overall Tour de Georgia
 9th Overall Vuelta a Colombia
1st Stage 9
2009
 1st  Overall Vuelta a Chihuahua
 1st  Overall Cascade Cycling Classic
 1st Stage 2 Vuelta a Asturias
 4th Overall Vuelta a la Comunidad de Madrid
1st Mountains classification
 4th Vuelta a La Rioja
2010
 1st  Overall Vuelta Mexico Telmex
 1st  Overall Vuelta a Antioquia
 1st Overall Clásica Nacional Marco Fidel Suárez
1st Stage 1
 2nd Overall Vuelta a Colombia
1st Stages 1 (TTT) & 14 (ITT)
2011
 1st Overall GP Internacional de Café
1st Prologue & Stage 1
 1st Overall Vuelta a Antioquia
 1st Prologue Vuelta al Valle del Cauca
 1st Prologue Vuelta al Tolima
 4th Overall Tour of Utah
 5th Overall Vuelta a Colombia
1st Stages 3 (TTT), 8 & 9
2012
 1st  Overall Vuelta Mexico Telmex
1st Stage 2
 1st Overall Vuelta a Boyacá
1st Stages 2 & 5
 1st Overall Clásico RCN
1st Points classification
1st Prologue, Stages 3 & 9
 1st Overall Vuelta a Chiriquí
1st Stage 6
 2nd Overall Clásica Nacional Ciudad de Anapoima
 2nd Overall Vuelta al Tolima
 4th Overall Vuelta a Cundinamarca
1st Stage 3
2013
 1st  Overall Vuelta a Colombia
1st Stage 4
 1st  Overall Tour do Rio
1st Stage 4
 1st Overall Clásica Rionegro con Futuro-Aguas de Rionegro
1st Prologue, Stages 1 & 2
 1st Overall Clásica Nacional Ciudad de Anapoima
1st Stages 2 & 3
 1st Overall Vuelta al Tolima
1st Prologue & Stage 2
 1st Overall Vuelta a Antioquia
1st Stages 1 & 3
 1st Stage 10 Clásico RCN
 2nd Overall Clásica de Fusagasugá
1st Stage 1
2014
 1st  Overall Vuelta a Colombia
1st  Points classification
1st Stages 1 (TTT) & 5
 1st  Overall Tour do Rio
1st Stage 1
 1st Overall Vuelta al Tolima
1st Prologue, Stages 3 & 4
 1st Overall Clásica Nacional Ciudad de Anapoima
1st Stages 2 & 3
 1st Overall Vuelta al Valle del Cauca
1st Stage 3
 1st Overall Clásica Rionegro con Futuro-Aguas de Rionegro
1st Stage 1
 1st Overall Clásica de Fusagasugá
1st Stage 3
 1st Stage 3 Clásica Club Deportivo Boyacá
 1st Stage 3 Clásico RCN
 Vuelta a Chiriquí
1st Stages 1 & 5
 2nd 2013–14 UCI America Tour
 3rd Overall Vuelta a Guatemala
1st Stages 1a (ITT) & 5
 4th Overall Volta de Ciclismo Internacional do Estado de São Paulo
 4th Overall Vuelta a Antioquia
2015
 1st  Overall Vuelta a Colombia
1st  Points classification
1st Stages 1 (TTT), 9 & 13 (ITT)
 1st Overall Clásica Nacional Ciudad de Anapoima
1st Stage 2
 1st Overall Vuelta a Antioquia
1st Stage 1
 1st Overall Vuelta a Chiriquí
1st Stages 3 & 9
 1st Overall Vuelta al Valle del Cauca
1st Stage 3
 1st Tocancipá
 1st Stage 2 Clásica Nacional Marco Fidel Suárez
 1st Stage 2 Clásica Rionegro con Futuro-Aguas de Rionegro
 2nd Overall Vuelta Mexico Telmex
 2nd Overall Circuito Internacional Baja California Sur
 6th Overall Tour do Rio
1st Stage 1
2016
 1st  Team time trial, Colombian National Road Championships
 1st Overall Vuelta al Valle del Cauca
1st Stages 4 & 5
 1st Overall Clásica Nacional Ciudad de Anapoima
1st Stages 1 & 3
 1st Overall Vuelta a Antioquia
1st Stage 3
 1st Overall Vuelta a Santander
1st Stage 1
 1st Overall Clásico RCN
1st Stage 2
 Vuelta a Chiriquí
1st Stages 2 (TTT), 5 & 8
 2nd Overall Vuelta a Colombia
1st  Points classification
1st Stage 1 (ITT)
 3rd Overall Clasico El Colombiano
 4th Overall Clásica Ramón Emilio Arcila
 5th Overall Clásica Club Deportivo Boyacá
1st Stage 2
2017
 1st  Overall Vuelta a la Comunidad de Madrid
 1st Overall Vuelta al Valle del Cauca
1st Stages 2 & 3
 1st Overall Clásica Nacional Ciudad de Anapoima
1st Stages 1 & 3
 1st Stage 7 Clásico RCN
 2nd Overall Vuelta a San Juan
 2nd Overall Tour of Ankara
1st Points classification
1st Stage 4
 2nd Overall Vuelta a Asturias
1st  Points classification
1st Stage 3
 4th Winston-Salem Cycling Classic
 6th Overall Vuelta a Castilla y León
 8th Overall Vuelta a Colombia
2018
 1st  Overall Vuelta a San Juan
1st Stage 5
 1st  Overall Vuelta al Ecuador
1st Stage 1
 1st Stage 5 Clásico RCN
 2nd Gran Premio FECOCI
 3rd Overall Vuelta a Colombia
2019
 1st  Overall Vuelta Ciclista de Chile
1st Prologue, Stages 2 & 4 (ITT)
 2nd Overall Vuelta a la Independencia Nacional
1st Stage 6
 2nd Overall Tour of the Gila
 2nd Overall Tour of Qinghai Lake
1st Stage 1 (TTT)
 3rd Overall Vuelta a San Juan
 3rd Overall Vuelta a Colombia
1st Prologue & Stage 10
 8th Overall Tour of Taihu Lake
2020
 2nd Overall Vuelta a Colombia
1st Stage 7
 2nd Overall Clásico RCN
1st Stage 5
 2nd Gran Premio de la Patagonia
 3rd Overall Vuelta a San Juan
2021
 2nd Overall Vuelta al Táchira
1st Stage 4 (ITT)
 3rd Overall Joe Martin Stage Race
 8th Overall Vuelta a Colombia
1st Prologue
 8th Overall Tour du Rwanda
2022
1st  Mountains classification Vuelta del Porvenir San Luis

Grand Tour general classification results timeline

References

External links 
 
 
 

1976 births
Living people
Sportspeople from the Province of Albacete
Spanish male cyclists
Vuelta a Colombia stage winners
Doping cases in cycling
Spanish sportspeople in doping cases
Cyclists from Castilla-La Mancha